The Montreal Marriott Château Champlain Hotel, commonly known as the Château Champlain, is a historic hotel located in Montreal, Quebec, Canada, overlooking Place du Canada, at 1050 De la Gauchetière Street West.

History
Opened on January 11, 1967, the Château Champlain was constructed by CP Hotels to accommodate the crowds visiting Expo 67. At the time it was the tallest hotel in Canada. Canadian Pacific Railways chairman Buck Crump proposed naming the hotel after the explorer and founder of Quebec City and New France, Samuel de Champlain.
Canadian Pacific sold the hotel in 1995, and it joined the Marriott hotel chain. In 2018 the hotel was purchased by the Tidan Hospitality and Real Estate Group for $65 million.

Architecture

The arch-shaped windows were intended by the designers to complement the Romanesque Revival arches of nearby Windsor Station, another Canadian Pacific property. D'Astous was a student of Frank Lloyd Wright, and the Château Champlain's arches have also been cited as similar to those used on Wright's last commission, the Marin County Civic Center. However, the arched openings have led some to nickname the building the "cheese grater".

Amenities
The Château Champlain has 596 guest rooms and 19 suites along with a health and fitness centre with cardiovascular and weight lifting equipment.

See also
 List of tallest buildings in Montreal

References

External links

 Official website
 Official Marriott site
 

Canadian Pacific Railway hotels
Hotels in Montreal
Skyscrapers in Montreal
Marriott hotels
Hotel buildings completed in 1967
Hotels established in 1967
Skyscraper hotels in Canada
Downtown Montreal
1967 establishments in Quebec
Roger D'Astous buildings